Cheumatopsyche analis is a species of netspinning caddisfly in the family Hydropsychidae.

References

Trichoptera
Articles created by Qbugbot
Insects described in 1903